Nemesia is a genus of mygalomorph spiders in the family Nemesiidae, first described by Jean Victoire Audouin in 1826.

Species
 it contains 71 species:

 N. africana (C. L. Koch, 1838) — Algeria
 N. albicomis Simon, 1914 — France (Corsica)
 N. algerina Zonstein, 2019 — Algeria
 N. almoravida Zonstein, 2019 — Algeria
 N. amicitia (Pertegal & Molero-Baltanás, 2022) — Spain
 N. angustata Simon, 1873 — Spain
 N. annaba Zonstein, 2019 — Algeria
 N. apenninica Decae, Pantini & Isaia, 2015 — Italy
 N. arboricola Pocock, 1903 — Malta
 N. arenicola Simon, 1892 — France (Corsica)
 N. asterix Decae & Huber, 2017 — Italy (Sardinia)
 N. athiasi Franganillo, 1920 — Portugal, Spain
 N. bacelarae Decae, Cardoso & Selden, 2007 — Portugal, Spain
 N. berlandi Frade & Bacelar, 1931 — Portugal
 N. bristowei Decae, 2005 — Spain (Majorca)
 N. budensis Kolosváry, 1939 — Hungary
 N. caementaria (Latreille, 1799) — Southern Europe
 N. caranhaci Decae, 1995 — Greece (Crete)
 N. carminans (Latreille, 1818) — France
 N. cecconii Kulczyński, 1907 — Italy
 N. cellicola Audouin, 1826 (type) — Mediterranean
 N. coheni Fuhn & Polenec, 1967 — Romania, Bulgaria
 N. cominensis (Cassar, Mifsud & Decae, 2022) — Malta
 N. congener O. Pickard-Cambridge, 1874 — France
 N. corsica Simon, 1914 — France (Corsica)
 N. crassimana Simon, 1873 — Spain
 N. cubana (Franganillo, 1930) — Cuba
 N. cypriatica (Özkütük, Yağmur, Elverici, Gücel, Altunsoy & Kunt, 2022) — Cyprus
 N. daedali Decae, 1995 — Greece (Crete)
 N. decaei Zonstein, 2019 — Algeria
 N. didieri Simon, 1892 — Algeria
 N. dido Zonstein, 2019 — Algeria
 N. dorthesi Thorell, 1875 — Spain, Morocco, Algeria
 N. dubia (Karsch, 1878) — Mozambique
 N. dubia O. Pickard-Cambridge, 1874 — Spain, France
 N. eleanora O. Pickard-Cambridge, 1873 — France
 N. entinae (Calvo & Pagán, 2022) — Spain
 N. fagei Frade & Bacelar, 1931 — Portugal
 N. fertoni Simon, 1914 — France (Corsica), Italy (Sardinia)
 N. f. sardinea Simon, 1914 — Italy (Sardinia)
 N. hastensis Decae, Pantini & Isaia, 2015 — Italy
 N. hispanica L. Koch, 1871 — Spain
 N. ibiza Decae, 2005 — Spain (Ibiza)
 N. ilvae Caporiacco, 1950 — Italy
 N. incerta O. Pickard-Cambridge, 1874 — France
 N. kahmanni Kraus, 1955 — Italy (Sardinia)
 N. macrocephala Ausserer, 1871 — Italy (Sicily), Malta, Algeria?
 N. m. occidentalis Frade & Bacelar, 1931 — Spain
 N. maculatipes Ausserer, 1871 — France (Corsica), Italy (Sardinia), Morocco?
 N. maltensis (Cassar, Mifsud & Decae, 2022) — Malta
 N. manderstjernae L. Koch, 1871 — France
 N. meridionalis (Costa, 1835) — Spain, France, Italy, Algeria?
 N. pannonica Herman, 1879 — Eastern Europe
 N. pavani Dresco, 1978 — Italy
 N. pedemontana Decae, Pantini & Isaia, 2015 — Italy
 N. qarthadasht (Calvo, 2021) — Spain
 N. randa Decae, 2005 — Spain (Majorca)
 N. raripila Simon, 1914 — Spain, France
 N. rastellata Wunderlich, 2011 — Greece (Karpathos)
 N. santeugenia Decae, 2005 — Spain (Majorca)
 N. santeulalia Decae, 2005 — Spain (Ibiza)
 N. sanzoi Fage, 1917 — Italy (Sicily)
 N. seldeni Decae, 2005 — Spain (Majorca)
 N. shenlongi (Pertegal, García, Molero-Baltanás & Knapp, 2022) — Spain
 N. simoni O. Pickard-Cambridge, 1874 — Portugal, Spain, France
 N. sinensis Pocock, 1901 — China
 N. tanit Zonstein, 2019 — Algeria
 N. transalpina (Doleschall, 1871) — Italy
 N. uncinata Bacelar, 1933 — Portugal, Spain
 N. ungoliant Decae, Cardoso & Selden, 2007 — Portugal
 N. valenciae Kraus, 1955 — Spain, Morocco

References

External links

Mygalomorphae genera
Nemesiidae